The Football Federation Tasmania 2014 season was the second season under the new competition format in Tasmania.  The competition consists of three major divisions across the State of Tasmania, created from the teams in the previous structure. The overall champion for the new structure qualified for the National Premier Leagues finals series, competing with the other state federation champions in a final knockout tournament to decide the National Premier Leagues Champion for 2014.

Men's Competitions

2014 NPL Tasmania

The 2014 T-League season was played over 21 rounds, from March to August 2014.

Finals

The top 4 teams play a knock-out finals series called the Victory Cup, where the semi-final match-ups were randomly drawn.

2014 Tasmanian Premier Leagues

2014 Northern Premier League

The 2014 Northern Premier League was the second edition of the new Northern Premier League as the second level domestic association football competition in Tasmania (third level overall in Australia). 9 teams competed, all playing each other twice for a total of 18 rounds. No teams were promoted or relegated this season.

Finals

2014 Southern Premier League

The 2014 Southern Premier League was the second edition of the new Southern Premier League as the second level domestic association football competition in Tasmania (third level overall in Australia). 6 teams competed, all playing each other four times for a total of 20 rounds. No teams were promoted or relegated this season.

Finals

2014 Tasmanian League One

2014 Northern League One

The 2014 Northern League One was the second edition of the new Tasmanian League One as the third level domestic association football competition in Tasmania (fourth level overall in Australia). 9 teams competed, all playing each other twice for a total of 16 matches. No teams were promoted or relegated this season, although Prospect Knights withdrew.

2014 Southern League One

The 2014 Southern League One was the second edition of the new Tasmanian League One as the third level domestic association football competition in Tasmania (fourth level overall in Australia). 5 teams competed, all playing each other four times for a total of 16 matches. At the end of the season, three teams were promoted as the competition was restructured.

2014 Tasmanian League Two

2014 Northern League Two

The 2014 Northern League Two was the second edition of the new Tasmanian League Two as the fourth level domestic association football competition in Tasmania (fifth level overall in Australia). 6 teams competed, all playing each other four times for a total of 20 matches. No teams were promoted or relegated this season.

NBTwo matches were postponed and subsequently could not be played.

2014 Southern League Two

The 2014 Southern League Two was the second edition of the new Tasmanian League Two as the fourth level domestic association football competition in Tasmania (fifth level overall in Australia). 6 teams competed, all playing each other four times for a total of 20 matches. No teams were promoted or relegated this season.

NBOne match was postponed and subsequently could not be played.

2014 Tasmanian League Three

2014 Southern League Three

The 2014 Southern League Three was the second edition of the new Tasmanian League Three as the fifth level domestic association football competition in Tasmania (sixth level overall in Australia). 12 teams competed, all playing each other twice during a total of 22 rounds. Two teams withdrew during the season and several matches were washed out, leaving the teams with an uneven number of matches played.

2014 Tasmanian League Four

2014 Southern League Four

The 2014 Southern League Four was the second edition of the new Tasmanian League Four as the sixth level domestic association football competition in Tasmania (seventh level overall in Australia). 11 teams competed, all playing a total of 22 matches. No teams were promoted or relegated this season.

NBThis ladder lists three more losses than wins and one more goal conceded than scored, as well as Cygnet Town having an odd number of matches played.

Women's Competitions

2014 Northern Premier League

2014 Southern Premier League

2014 Statewide Finals series

Cup Competitions

The Milan Lakoseljac Cup competition also served as the Tasmanian Preliminary rounds for the 2014 FFA Cup. South Hobart entered at the Round of 32, where they were eliminated.

References

2014 in Australian soccer
Football Federation Tasmania seasons